The 1992 Senior League World Series took place from August 16–22 in Kissimmee, Florida, United States. Pingtung, Taiwan defeated Santo Domingo, Dominican Republic in the championship game. It was Taiwan's fifth straight championship, and 17th overall.

Teams

Results

Winner's Bracket

Loser's Bracket

Placement Bracket

Elimination Round

References

Senior League World Series
Senior League World Series
1992 in sports in Florida